The Progressive Conservative Party of Prince Edward Island held a leadership election on February 9, 2019, following the resignation of leader James Aylward. Five candidates were registered at the close of nominations on November 30, 2018. Dennis King was elected leader, on the second ballot.

Candidates
Allan Dale, declared 13 November 2018
Dennis King, declared 21 November 2018
Shawn Driscoll, declared 23 November 2018
Sarah Stewart-Clark, declared 26 November 2018
Kevin Arsenault, declared 5 December 2018

Results
First Ballot:
Dennis King – 2,014
Allan Dale – 746
Kevin Arsenault – 590
Sarah Stewart-Clark – 527
Shawn Driscoll – 307

Second Ballot:
Dennis King – 2,071
Allan Dale – 803
Kevin Arsenault – 661
Sarah Stewart-Clark – 601

References

Progressive Conservative Party of Prince Edward Island
2019 elections in Canada
February 2019 events in Canada
Progressive Conservative Party of Prince Edward Island leadership election